Ruth Thompson (September 15, 1887 – April 5, 1970) was a Republican politician from the U.S. state of Michigan. A lawyer by profession, she served three terms in the United States House of Representatives from 1951 to 1957.

Biography

Early life and education
Thompson was born in Whitehall, Michigan and attended the public schools.  She graduated from Muskegon Business College of nearby Muskegon in 1905, and became a lawyer with a private practice.

Early career
She was registrar of probate court of Muskegon County and judge of probate from 1925 to 1937.  She gained national recognition as an advocate for children's rights during that period. She was elected the county's first female state representative in 1938 and served as a member of the Michigan House of Representatives (Muskegon County 1st district) from 1939 to 1941.

Thompson then served on the Social Security Board, 1941–1942; staff for United States Labor Department, 1942; United States Adjutant General's Office, 1942–1946; and then member and chair of the Michigan state Prison Commission for Women. During and after World War II she worked as a civilian employee of the U.S. Army in Washington D.C. and in Europe.

Congress
In 1950, Thompson was elected as a Republican from Michigan's 9th congressional district to the 82nd Congress and subsequently re-elected to the two succeeding Congresses serving from January 3, 1951 to January 3, 1957 in the U.S. House.  She was the first woman to represent Michigan in Congress and the first woman to serve on the House Judiciary Committee.

On February 26, 1954, Thompson introduced legislation to ban mailing "obscene, lewd, lascivious or filthy" phonograph (rock and roll) records.

She was an unsuccessful candidate for re-nomination to the 85th Congress in 1956, being defeated by fellow Republican Robert P. Griffin and returned to her home in Whitehall.

Death
Ruth Thompson died in Plainwell Sanitorium in Allegan County, Michigan, and was interred in Oakhurst Cemetery of Whitehall.

See also
 Women in the United States House of Representatives

References

External links
The Political Graveyard
Michigan Historical Markers

1887 births
1970 deaths
Republican Party members of the Michigan House of Representatives
Female members of the United States House of Representatives
Michigan state court judges
Republican Party members of the United States House of Representatives from Michigan
Women state legislators in Michigan
People from Whitehall, Michigan
20th-century American judges
20th-century American women politicians
20th-century American politicians
20th-century American women judges